Babar Azam is a Pakistani cricketer and current all-format captain of the Pakistan national cricket team. , he has played 44 Tests, 92 One Day Internationals (ODIs), and 99 Twenty20 Internationals (T20Is) for Pakistan. He has scored centuries (100 or more runs in an innings) on 28 occasions, scoring 9 centuries in Tests, 17 in ODIs, and 2 in T20Is. In 2022, Babar Azam became the Pakistani batter with the most runs — 2,598 — in all formats of the game in a calendar year.

Babar has been described by former England captain Michael Vaughan as "one of the best Test players in the World". He has been named in the ICC Men's ODI Team of the Year on three occasions, captaining it in 2021, the year he also captained the ICC Men's T20I Team of the Year. He was also captain of the 2021 ICC Men's T20 World Cup Team of the Tournament.

Azam made his Test debut in October 2016, and scored his first century two years later when he made 127* against New Zealand at Dubai. His highest Test score of 196 came against Australia in March 2022; his innings included the highest-ever score by a captain in the fourth innings of a match and the second-longest innings by a batter in the fourth innings of a Test. Azam has scored Test centuries against five different opponents at five grounds, including three at grounds outside Pakistan.

Azam made his ODI debut in May 2015 and scored his first century in the format a year later in 2016, making 120 against the West Indies. This was followed by scores of 123 and 117, making him the third Pakistani batsman and eighth batsman overall to score three consecutive ODI hundreds. In 2022, he scored three consecutive ODI hundreds again, with two centuries against Australia and one against the West Indies, making him the first batsman to do this on two occasions. His highest ODI score of 158 was made against England in July 2021. His ODI centuries, which were scored at thirteen different venues, have come against seven different opponents.

He made his T20I debut in September 2016 and has scored two centuries in the format, with the first one coming against South Africa at Centurion. His second century was made against England at Karachi in September 2022, making him the only Pakistani to score more than one T20I century.

Key

Test centuries

One Day International centuries

T20I centuries

Footnotes

References

External links

Azam, Babar
Azam, Babar